The Christmas Boot is a 2016 picture book by Lisa Wheeler and illustrator Jerry Pinkney. It is about a woman, Hannah Greyweather, who finds a single black boot, that turns out to be owned by Santa.

Reception
School Library Journal, in a review of The Christmas Boot, recognised it as a "retelling of the folktale of the "Fisherman's Wife" who greedily wishes for too much has a kinder ending" but with "a kinder ending" and concluded "A worthy holiday reimagining, best enjoyed as an independent read or as a read-aloud in a small group setting"

The Horn Book Magazine wrote "the storytelling is a little too loose to be completely satisfying, but the air of Christmas mystery and coziness is successfully maintained thanks to Pinkney's snowy pencil and watercolor illustrations of a country Christmas and a heroine who is satisfied with what she has and happy with what she gets: a puppy."

The Christmas Boot has also been reviewed by Publishers Weekly, Booklist, Kirkus Reviews, and The New York Times.

References

2016 children's books
American picture books
Picture books by Jerry Pinkney
Santa Claus in fiction
Christmas children's books